Alliance-Union may refer to:
 The Alliance–Union universe of science fiction and fantasy writer C. J. Cherryh
 Popular Alliance – UDEUR, a political party in Italy
 Alliance Union of Cordoba, a provincial political party in Argentina